Nagnath Lalujirao Kottapalle (Devanagari: नागनाथ लालूजीराव कोत्तापल्ले; 29 March 1948 – 30 November 2022) was an Indian educationist and Marathi writer from Maharashtra. He was the vice chancellor of Dr. Babasaheb Ambedkar Marathwada University, whose seat is in Aurangabad, Maharashtra. He was elected as a president of 86th Akhil Bharatiya Marathi Sahitya Sammelan scheduled to be held at Chiplun.

Early life and education
Kottapalle was born in the town of Mukhed in Nanded District on 29 March 1948. He received his B.A. (1969), M.A. (1971), and Ph.D (1980) degrees from Marathwada University in Marathi literature.

Career
Kottapalle started his career as a college lecturer in 1971 and moved up to be the head of Marathi department at University of Pune in 1996.

Kottapalle was a member of the following educational or literary organizations:

Publications

Awards
 Maharashtra state awards for the following literary works
 Moods (1976) (Poetry)
Sandharbha (1984) (Short Stories)
 Gandhariche Dole (1985) (Novel)
 Gramin Sahitya 1985 (Critique)
 Udyachya Sunder Divsasathi (2002) (Essays)
 Keshavrao Vichare Paritoshik for Jyotiparva (2002) (Biography)
 B. Raghunath Award for Rakha Ani Paus (1995) (Short stories)
 Mahatma Phule Purskar for Rakha Ani Paus (1995)
 Parimal Award for Gramin Sahitya : Swarup Ani Shodh (1985) (Critique)
 Shirish Gandhi Literary Award for Sahitya Awakash (Critique)
 Yeshwantrao Chavan Literary Award (2001)

References

1948 births
2022 deaths
Marathi-language writers
Academic staff of Savitribai Phule Pune University
People from Nanded district
People from Marathwada
Presidents of the Akhil Bharatiya Marathi Sahitya Sammelan